Nyakrom is a town in the Agona West Municipal District of the Central Region of Ghana. The town is known for the Nyakrom Day Secondary School.  The school is a second cycle institution. Nyakrom is the sixty-second most populous settlement in Ghana, in terms of population, with a population of 22,911 people. Nyakrom has a Wesleyan Methodist Church. Catechist Henry Amoa Saah played important role in its planting and growth at the foundational stages.
Nyakrom is known for having first rural bank in Ghana

References

Populated places in the Central Region (Ghana)